Chitra Ramkrishna (born 1963) is an Indian businesswoman and the former CEO of the National Stock Exchange (NSE). In March 2022, she was arrested by the Central Bureau of Investigation (CBI) for her involvement in the co-location scam.

Career
In 1985, she started as a chartered accountant, at the project finance division of the Industrial Development Bank of India (IDBI). Ramkrishna then spend two years at the Securities and Exchange Board of India (SEBI), after which she returned to IDBI. In April 2013, she succeeded Ravi Narain and became the managing director and CEO of NSE.

Cases

Co-location case 
In 2016, she was found guilty in a co-location case, and was asked by SEBI to disgorge 25 percent of the salary drawn for FY 2013-14, to the IPEF. She was also, prohibited from associating with a listed company or a market Infrastructure Institution or any other market intermediary for a period of five years.

'Himalayan Yogi' case 
In February 2022, the Securities and Exchange Board of India (SEBI) said that for the past 20 years, she had been allowing an unidentified 'Himalayan yogi' to advise her on important decisions. The case was investigated by the CBI. She leaked key business information pertaining to day to day operations. She was arrested by the CBI on 7th March 2022.

See also 
 Chanda Kochhar

References

Indian chief executives
Living people
Indian women chief executives
Indian accountants
1963 births